Humpherson is a surname. Notable people with the surname include:

 Andrew Humpherson (born 1960), Australian politician
 Victor Humpherson (1896–1978), English cricketer